Edward Peter Stringham (born January 18, 1975) is an Austrian School American economist, former President of the American Institute for Economic Research in Great Barrington, Massachusetts (until May 2021), and the Davis Professor of Economic Innovation at Trinity College (Connecticut).

He received a B.A. in economics from College of the Holy Cross and his Ph.D. from George Mason University.

He was associate professor at San Jose State University from 2002 to 2008, the F.A. Hayek Endowed visiting professor at University of Klagenfurt in 2008, and Shelby Cullom Davis visiting associate professor at Trinity College from 2008 to 2010. He has also held faculty positions at Fayetteville State University and Texas Tech University.

He has been the editor of the Journal of Private Enterprise since 2006. Additionally, he served as the President of the Association of Private Enterprise Education from 2006 to 2007. He has edited Anarchy, State and Public Choice (2006) and Anarchy and the Law: The Political Economy of Choice (2007).

In 2006, he published a study together with Bethany Peters titled "No Booze? You May Lose: Why Drinkers Earn More Money Than Nondrinkers" (with the Reason Foundation). For that seeming controversial statement, he made numerous television appearances. In 2009 and 2010 he published the related "The Catastrophe of What Passes for Alcohol Policy Analysis" and he gave testimony before the Connecticut legislature on alcohol restrictions.

In an interview with Forbes in 2019, Stringham opposed any tax and social security.

In May 2020, Stringham said during a CNBC interview that the unemployment rate was expected to reach 16% but that the slight improvements were already noticeable.

In July 2020, The Christian Science Monitor discussed the question "Why libertarians are joining BLM calls to defund police". Stringham pointed out a lot of parallels with the libertarians believing that the responsibilities of police departments today would be better performed by local private security bodies and suitable alternatives to state police as adopted in some other countries.

Stringham has appeared on dozens of media outlets including CNBC, Fox News, MTV, and NPR.

Bibliography

References

External links
 Mises, Bastiat, Public Opinion and Public Choice, By Bryan Caplan & Edward Stringham
 No Booze? You May Lose: Why Drinkers Earn More Money Than Nondrinkers, By Bethany Peters and Edward Stringham
 , video-segment on CNBC (September 2006)
 The Catastrophe of What Passes for Alcohol Policy Analysis, By Edward Stringham; Project director Adrian Moore
 Stringham Media archives at the Mises Institute
 
 
 
  with Michael Malice

1975 births
Living people
Academic journal editors
American book editors
American economics writers
21st-century American economists
American libertarians
American male non-fiction writers
American political writers
American anarcho-capitalists
Austrian School economists
George Mason University alumni
Mises Institute people
San Jose State University faculty
Trinity College (Connecticut) faculty